The white-winged swamp warbler (Bradypterus carpalis), also known as the white-winged scrub-warbler, is a species of Old World warbler in the family Locustellidae.  It is found in Burundi, Democratic Republic of the Congo, Kenya, Rwanda, Tanzania, Uganda, and Zambia.  Its natural habitat is swamps.

References

white-winged swamp warbler
Birds of Central Africa
Birds of East Africa
white-winged swamp warbler
white-winged swamp warbler
Taxonomy articles created by Polbot